The Palladium RPG Book 4: Adventures in the Northern Wilderness is a supplement published by Palladium Books in 1989 for the Palladium Fantasy Role-Playing Game.

Contents
The Palladium RPG Book 4: Adventures in the Northern Wilderness is a campaign setting and scenario book which describes the wooded and mountainous northern wilderness and its barbaric empire of 12 wolfen tribes.

Publication history
Palladium Books published the Palladium Fantasy Role-Playing Game in 1983. The following year, they began to release regional adventure guides that contained information about specific regions of the continent on which the original game was set. As the title suggests, The Palladium RPG Book 4: Adventures in the Northern Wilderness was the fourth book in this series, released in 1989 as a 96-page book written by Thomas Bartold, Grant Boucher, Kevin Davies, Jeffrey Gomez, Kevin Long, Alex Marciniszyn, Kevin Siembieda, and Erick Wujcik, with a cover by Keith Parkinson.

This was followed in 1990 by Book V: "Further" Adventures in the Northern Wilderness. 

In 1996, when Palladium published a second edition of  Palladium Fantasy Role-Playing Game, the two "Northern Wilderness" regional guides were replaced by a new regional guide, Wolfen Empire, published in 2003.

Reviews
Shadis (Issue 4 - Aug 1990)
White Wolf #19 (Feb./March, 1990)
Games Review Vol. 2, Issue 3 (December 1989)
GamesMaster International Issue 1 - Aug 1990

References

Palladium Fantasy Role-Playing Game supplements
Role-playing game supplements introduced in 1989